Ayoola Ogundeyi Jr. (born 9 August 1989), better known as Ayo Jay, is an English-born Nigerian singer. He currently has a record deal with One Nation and RCA, and is also known as Boy Wonder.

Early life 
Ayo Jay discovered his abilities for singing and songwriting at a young age. After graduating from International School, Lagos (ISL) in 2006, Ayo Jay relocated to the United States to pursue a college degree in finance and investment from Baruch College.

Career 
In 2013, Ayo Jay signed a recording deal with One Nation Records and released "Your Number" on 21 June 2013. The music video for "Your Number" was shot in Atlanta. The song's remix features rap vocals by Fetty Wap and was released on 16 July 2015. "Your Number" was re-released by RCA Records following Ayo Jay's record deal with the label. On 28 February 2017, the song was certified gold by the RIAA. On 23 August 2016, RCA Records released another remix, featuring Chris Brown and Kid Ink.

Discography

Singles

Awards and nominations

See also 
List of Nigerian musicians

References

External links 
 Ayo Jay's profile at One Nation Records

Living people
Yoruba musicians
21st-century Nigerian male singers
Baruch College alumni
1989 births
RCA Records artists
British emigrants to Nigeria
Nigerian emigrants to the United States